Pilocrocis runatalis is a moth in the family Crambidae. It was described by Harrison Gray Dyar Jr. in 1914. It is found in Panama.

The wingspan is about 20 mm. The forewings are a little bronzy-blackish brown with dark lines, the inner one obscure and the outer line rather broad. The reniform (kidney-shaped) spot is solid, black and distinct. The hindwings have a nearly regularly curved medial line.

References

Pilocrocis
Moths described in 1914
Moths of Central America